Sporopodiopsis sipmanii is a species of foliicolous (leaf-dwelling), crustose lichen in the family Pilocarpaceae. Found in Sabah, Malaysia, it was formally described as a new species in 1997 by Belgian lichenologist Emmanuël Sérusiaux. The type specimen was collected by Harrie Sipman from Mount Kinabalu; the species name sipmanii acknowledges him. The lichen produces asexual spores (conidia) within curved, dorsiventral structures called campylidia; the presence of apothecia in addition to campylidia readily distinguishes it from the other species in the genus, Sporopodiopsis mortimeriana.

References

Pilocarpaceae
Lichen species
Lichens described in 1997
Taxa named by Emmanuël Sérusiaux
Lichens of Malaysia